Aujourd'hui Le Maroc is a daily francophone Moroccan newspaper. It is a general-information and politically independent newspaper.

History and profile
Aujourd'hui Le Maroc  was first published in 2001 by ALM Publishing. The paper was founded by Khalil Hachimi Idriss, current director of the state official press agency Maghreb Arabe Presse, who also owns a stake in the publishing company of ALM. The state-owned pension fund caisse de dépôt et de gestion is amongst the shareholders of the newspaper.

As of 2008, Idriss was also the editor-in-chief of the daily which has an independent political stance.

It had a daily distribution of 20,000 copies in 2003.

See also
 List of Moroccan newspapers
 Presse Maroc - جريدة إلكترونية مغربية

References

External links

A
Publications established in 2001
2001 establishments in Morocco
French-language newspapers published in Morocco
Mass media in Casablanca